Guill is a surname. People with the surname include:

Antonio de Guill y Gonzaga (died 1768), Spanish colonial administrator
Ben H. Guill (1909–1994), member of the U.S. House of Representatives from Texas
Julianna Guill (born 1987), American actress
Marshall Guill (1897–1931), American football and baseball player

See also
Guill., taxonomic author abbreviation of Jean Baptiste Antoine Guillemin (1796–1842), French botanist